Borough 7 is an eastern borough of Düsseldorf, the state capital of North Rhine-Westphalia, Germany. The borough covers an area of 27.97 square kilometres and (as of December 2020) has about 47,000 inhabitants. The borough borders with the Düsseldorf boroughs 8, 2 and 6 to the South, West and North. To the East the borough borders with the rural district of Mettmann.

Subdivisions 
Borough 7 is made up of five Stadtteile (city parts):

Places of interest

Arts, Culture and Entertainment 
 Düsseldorf-Grafenberg Racecourse, Grafenberg

Landmarks 
 St. Margareta, Gerresheim

Parks and open spaces 
 Ostpark

Transportation 
The borough is served by numerous railway stations and highway. Stations include Düsseldorf-Gerresheim and both Düsseldorf Stadtbahn light rail- and Rheinbahn tram-stations. The borough can also be reached via Bundesautobahn 3 as well as Bundesstraße 7 and 8.

See also 
 Boroughs of Düsseldorf

References

External links 
 Official webpage of the borough 

!